Stefan Ekberg (born 21 January 1972 in Motala, Sweden) is a former international motorcycle speedway rider from Sweden.

Career
Ekberg is a full Swedish international, making his debut in 1994. He previously rode in the UK for the Oxford Cheetahs and the Eastbourne Eagles, where he won the Elite League Championship in 1995. He returned to the British Premier League with the Glasgow Tigers after a ten-year absence in 2005. In 2007, the Rye House Rockets signed Ekberg mid season to replace the injured Stuart Robson and the Rockets went on to become Premier League champions that season. He was retained by promoter Len Silver for 2008.

References 

1972 births
Living people
Swedish speedway riders
Glasgow Tigers riders
Rye House Rockets riders
Eastbourne Eagles riders
Oxford Cheetahs riders
People from Motala Municipality
Sportspeople from Östergötland County